Edward King, 1st Earl of Kingston PC (I) (29 March 1726 – 8 November 1797) was an Anglo-Irish politician and peer.

He was the eldest son of Sir Henry King, 3rd Baronet and Isabella Wingfield, daughter of Edward Wingfield. He had a twin sister Frances, who married Hans Widman Wood of Rosmead, County Westmeath and had issue, including Isabella. He sat in the Irish House of Commons as the Member of Parliament for Boyle between 1749 and 1760, before sitting for Sligo County from 1761 to 1764. On 22 May 1755 he succeeded to the family baronetcy following the premature death of his elder brother, Robert King, 1st Baron Kingsborough. On 15 July 1764 he was elevated to the Peerage of Ireland as Baron Kingston and assumed his seat in the Irish House of Lords. He was further honoured when he was made Viscount Kingston on 15 November 1766 and Earl Kingston on 25 August 1768, both also Irish peerages.

Lord Kingston held the office of Custos Rotulorum of Roscommon between 1772 and his death in 1797, and was made a member of the Privy Council of Ireland on 20 January 1794. He was a Freemason, who served two terms as Grand Master of the Grand Lodge of Ireland; between 1761 and 1763, and 1769 to 1770.

Family
He married Jane Caulfeild, daughter of Thomas Caulfeild and Peggy Jordan, on 5 January 1752 and had seven children. He was succeeded in his titles by his eldest surviving son, Robert. His daughter Jane married Lawrence Parsons, 1st Earl of Rosse. Another daughter Frances married Thomas  Tenison. of Kilronan Castle, County Roscommon: they were the parents of Edward King-Tenison, the Whig  politician and pioneering photographer.

References

|-

1726 births
1797 deaths
18th-century Anglo-Irish people
Peers of Ireland created by George III
Irish MPs 1727–1760
Irish MPs 1761–1768
Edward
Members of the Privy Council of Ireland
Members of the Irish House of Lords
Members of the Parliament of Ireland (pre-1801) for County Roscommon constituencies
Members of the Parliament of Ireland (pre-1801) for County Sligo constituencies
Earls of Kingston